Osip Naumovich Abdulov (in Łódź – 14 June 1953 in Moscow) was a Soviet actor.

Biography
Osip Naumovich Abdulov was born to a Jewish family in Łódź, Poland (then part of the Russian Empire) in 1900. He briefly studied at Moscow University (now Moscow State University) in 1917 before turning his interest to acting.

Abdulov began working at the Shalyapin studio in 1918, where he had first performing role in 1919. He worked at various theaters in Moscow during the 1920s and 1930s and joined the company of the Theater of the Mossovet in 1943.

Abdulov additionally worked for Soviet radio broadcasting (first as an announcer and actor, then as a director) in 1924. He was involved in radio plays based on the dramatic works of Romain Rolland, Alphonse Daudet, Charles Dickens, Nikolay Gogol, and Maxim Gorky and took part in organizing artistic broadcasting for children. Abdulov worked as a news reader on Soviet radio during World War II.

Abdulov began to appear in films in 1933.

He became a People's Artist of the RSFSR in 1944. He was awarded the Order of the Red Banner of Labour in 1949 and a Stalin State Prize (second degree) in 1951.

Osip Abdulov's son Vsevolod Osipovich Abdulov (1942 - 2002) also became a notable actor. Both were interred at the Vvedenskoye Cemetery in Moscow.

Notable roles

Theater roles

Film roles

References

External links
  Biography

1900 births
1953 deaths
Actors from Łódź
20th-century Polish Jews
People's Artists of the RSFSR
Stalin Prize winners
Recipients of the Order of the Red Banner of Labour
Soviet male actors
Jewish Russian actors
Soviet Jews
Burials at Vvedenskoye Cemetery